Deputy Chief of Air Force (DCAF) is the second most senior appointment in the Royal Australian Air Force, responsible to the Chief of Air Force (CAF). Before 1997 the position was entitled Deputy Chief of the Air Staff (DCAS). The rank associated with the position is air vice marshal (two-star). DCAF acts as the manager of the Air Force Headquarters (AFHQ), which provides oversight of activities in the raising, training and sustaining of assigned RAAF capabilities. The position provides strategic leadership to the RAAF as a whole, as well as policy guidance in regard to Air Force activities to the rest of the Defence organisation and Government. The current Deputy Chief of Air Force is Air Vice Marshal Glen Braz.

Appointees
The following list chronologically records those who have held the post of Deputy Chief of Air Force or its preceding position of Deputy Chief of the Air Staff. The rank and honours are as at the completion of the commander's term.

References

External links
Official RAAF Deputy Chief of Air Force Biography page

Air force appointments
Leadership of the Australian Defence Force